Central Railroad of New Jersey Station may refer to:

any former station of the Central Railroad of New Jersey, or
Central Railroad of New Jersey (Fanwood, New Jersey), listed on the NRHP in New Jersey
Central Railroad of New Jersey Freight Station, Scranton, Pennsylvania, listed on the NRHP in Pennsylvania
Central Railroad of New Jersey Station (Jim Thorpe, Pennsylvania), listed on the NRHP in Pennsylvania
Central Railroad of New Jersey Station (Wilkes-Barre, Pennsylvania), listed on the NRHP in Pennsylvania